The Society of Authors (SoA) is a United Kingdom trade union for professional writers, illustrators and literary translators, founded in 1884 to protect the rights and further the interests of authors. , it represents over 12,000 members and associates.

The SoA vets members' contracts and advises on professional issues, as well as providing training, representing authors in collective negotiations with publishers to improve contract terms, lobbying on issues that affect authors such as copyright, UK arts funding and Public Lending Right.

The SoA administers a range of grants for writers in need (The Authors' Contingency Fund, The Francis Head Bequest and The P.D. James Memorial Fund) and to fund work in progress (The Authors’ Foundation and K Blundell Trust), awarding more than £250,000 to writers each year.

The SoA also administers prizes for fiction, non-fiction, poetry, translation and drama, including the Betty Trask Award and the Somerset Maugham Award.

The SoA acts as the literary representative for the estates of a number of writers. This list includes George Bernard Shaw, Virginia Woolf, Philip Larkin, E. M. Forster, Rosamond Lehmann, Walter de la Mare, John Masefield and Compton Mackenzie.

Authors of all kinds are eligible to join, whether they are already established or at the beginning of their careers.

History

The SoA has counted among its members and presidents numerous notable writers and poets, including Tennyson (first president), George Bernard Shaw, John Galsworthy, Alasdair Gray, John Edward Masefield, Thomas Hardy, H. G. Wells, J. M. Barrie and E. M. Forster.

Bernard Shaw was an early member who took a prominent part in action and discussions, founding the League of Dramatists in 1931 as part of the SoA. The Authors' Licensing and Collection Society was also formed after much action by the SoA.

Well known contemporary members include Philip Pullman (SoA president from 2013 to March 2022), Malorie Blackman, Neil Gaiman, Philip Gross, Judith Kerr, Hilary Mantel, J. K. Rowling and Lemn Sissay.

The Society of Authors' quarterly journal, The Author, was first published in 1890. Its first editor was novelist and historian Walter Besant, the SoA's founding Chair. He was succeeded by George Herbert, author Denys Kilham Roberts, author C. R. Hewitt (writing as "C. H. Rolph"), the theatre critic, biographer and newspaper editor Richard Findlater, author Derek Parker, novelist Andrew Taylor, novelist and publisher Fanny Blake and novelist and publisher Andrew Rosenheim. Since November 2012 the journal's editor has been the writer and critic James McConnachie.

In 1958 the Translators Association (TA) was established as a specialist group within the Society of Authors.

Legacy 
In 1969 the British Library acquired the archive of the Society of Authors from 1879 to 1968 consisting of six hundred and ninety volumes. The British Library acquired a further two hundred and fifty-eight volumes in 1982 and 1984.

Awards and prizes
Prizes for fiction, poetry, and non-fiction administered by the SoA include:

 The ADCI (Authors with Disabilities and Chronic Illnesses) Literary Prize, from 2022
The ALCS Educational Writers' Award
The Betty Trask Prize and Awards
The Cholmondeley Award
The Elizabeth Longford Prize for Historical Biography
The Eric Gregory Award
The Imison Award
The Tinniswood Award
The McKitterick Prize
The Paul Torday Memorial Prize, for debut novelists over 60
The Somerset Maugham Award
The Sunday Times Young Writer of the Year Award
The ALCS Tom-Gallon Trust Award
The Travelling Scholarships
The Queen's Knickers Award
The Gordon Bowker Volcano Prize for a novel focusing on travel 

The organisation also administers a number of literary translation prizes, including:

 The TA First Translation Prize, for translation from any language (annual)
 The Goethe-Institut Award, for German Translation (biennial)
 The John Florio Prize, for Italian Translation (biennial)
 The Banipal Prize, or The Saif Ghobash Banipal Prize for Arabic Translation (annual)
 The Scott Moncrieff Prize, for French Translation (annual)
 The Schlegel-Tieck Prize, for German Translation (annual)
 The Bernard Shaw Prize, for Swedish Translation (triennial)
 The Vondel Prize, for Dutch Translation (biennial)
 The Premio Valle Inclan, for Spanish Translation (annual)
 The TLS-Risa Domb/Porjes Prize, for Hebrew translation (triennial)

It has previously administered the following prizes:

The Sunday Times EFG Short Story Award
 Calouste Gulbenkian Prize, for Portuguese Translation (triennial)
 Hellenic Foundation for Culture Award, for Greek Translation (triennial)
The Women's Prize for Fiction

See also

Writers' Guild of Great Britain
Authors' Licensing and Collecting Society

References

External links

Trade unions in the United Kingdom
 
1884 establishments in the United Kingdom

Trade unions established in 1884